The 2017–18 Big Bash League season or BBL|07 was the seventh season of the KFC Big Bash League, the professional men's Twenty20 domestic cricket competition in Australia. The tournament started on 19 December 2017 and finished on 4 February 2018. Perth Scorchers were the defending champions. The competition was extended to a total of 40 group games for the first time, each team playing ten matches in the group.

The title was won by Adelaide Strikers (their first ever and sole BBL title until now), who defeated Hobart Hurricanes at the Adelaide Oval.

Teams

Venues 
Thirteen venues were selected to host the matches with Traeger Park, GMHBA Stadium and University of Tasmania Stadium all holding their first BBL match. The newly completed Optus Stadium was also added to the list of host grounds after the Perth Scorchers finished top of the table at the end of the main season, earning the right to host the first semi-final at the new stadium.

Fixtures

Round 1

Match 1

Match 2

Match 3

Match 4

Round 2

Match 5

Match 6

Match 7

Match 8

Round 3

Match 9

Match 10

Match 11

Match 12

Round 4

Match 13

Match 14

Match 15

Match 16

Round 5

Match 17

Match 18

Match 19

Match 20

Round 6

Match 21

Match 22

Match 23

Match 24

Round 7

Match 25

Match 26

Match 27

Match 28

Round 8

Match 29

Match 30

Match 31

Match 32

Round 9

Match 33

Match 34

Match 35

Match 36

Round 10

Match 37

Match 38

Match 39

Match 40

Points table

Knockout Phase

Semi-finals

Semi-final 1

Semi-final 2

Final

Statistics

Most runs

Source: ESPNcricinfo, 4 February 2018

Most wickets 

Source: ESPNcricinfo, 4 February 2018

Attendances

TV audience
This was the last season BBL games in Australia were broadcast by the free-to-air channel Network Ten.

Following are the television ratings for 2017–18 BBL season in Australia.

References

Further reading

External links
 Official website

Big Bash League seasons
Big Bash League
Big Bash League
2017–18 Big Bash League